Michael Christopher Fillery (born 17 September 1960) is an English former professional footballer who played for Chelsea, Queens Park Rangers, Portsmouth, Oldham Athletic, Millwall and Torquay United as a midfielder during the 1970s, 1980s and 1990s. Fillery was Chelsea player of the year in 1982.

Career
Mike Fillery signed professional forms for Chelsea in August 1978. This stylish midfielder played many fine games for Chelsea, though sometimes inconsistent, during a difficult and troubled period for Chelsea Football Club. Mike Fillery was Chelsea Player of the Year in 1982 and also won the Chelsea Official Supporter's Club award in the same year. He was transferred to Queens Park Rangers nearby in West London in August 1983 for £200,000.

Fillery was the last Chelsea youth team product to score 10 or more goals in back-to-back seasons until Tammy Abraham achieved the feat during the 2020–21 season.

Honours
Individual
Chelsea Player of the Year: 1982

References

1960 births
Living people
Footballers from Mitcham
English footballers
Association football midfielders
Chelsea F.C. players
Queens Park Rangers F.C. players
Portsmouth F.C. players
Oldham Athletic A.F.C. players
Millwall F.C. players
Torquay United F.C. players
Crawley Town F.C. players
English Football League players